Gail Jones may refer to:
 Gail Jones (writer), Australian novelist and academic
 Gail Jones (entrepreneur), British businesswoman and entrepreneur

See also
 Gayl Jones,  American writer